Anthony Sinisuka Ginting (born October 20, 1996) is an Indonesian badminton player. He first rose to prominence when he won the bronze medal at the 2018 Asian Games. At the 2020 Olympics, he won bronze in the men's singles event. He became the first Youth Olympic badminton medalist to win a medal at the Olympics, having also won bronze in 2014. Ginting was part of Indonesia winning team at the 2020 Thomas Cup.

Early life
The badminton player who was born in Cimahi, of Karo descent, was introduced to badminton by his father when he was still in kindergarten. He is the fourth of five children. As a child, he joined PB SGS PLN in Bandung, West Java, a badminton club that fostered Indonesian badminton legend Taufik Hidayat. He started participating in tournaments around the age of 9 years old, two years after he was scouted.

Career

2013–2014: World Junior Championships and Youth Olympics bronze medals 
Ginting participated at the Indonesian Masters Grand Prix Gold, Vietnam International Challenge, Maldives International Challenge, Malaysia International Challenge and Asia Junior Championships in Kota Kinabalu, Malaysia.

In 2014, Ginting joining the national training camp early year, he began to show his worth with stepping up to cruise into Asian Junior Championships quarterfinals in Taipei, Chinese Taipei on February. In the quarterfinals, he was halted with a 13–21, 15–21 loss to Kanta Tsuneyama of Japan. Ginting then participated at the World Junior Championships in Alor Setar, Malaysia where he won a boys' singles bronze medal after bowed out in the semifinal to Shi Yuqi of China for 19–21, 15–21. He also competed at the 2014 Summer Youth Olympics in Nanjing, China and brought home a bronze medal after beating Aditya Joshi of India in the bronze-final match with a straight games 21–17, 21–16. In addition to competing in some international challenge tournaments, he also played in the BWF Grand Prix tournaments such as Chinese Taipei Open, Vietnam Open and Indonesian Masters.

2015–2016: First Indonesia Open and Thomas Cup Final  
Starting his journey as a rookie in the BWF Superseries event from the qualifying stage, Ginting moved into the quarterfinals after creating an upset with a rubber games 14–21, 22–20, 21–13 win over India's top shuttler and fourth seed Srikanth Kidambi in the second round of the Indonesia Open. His Indonesia Open campaign was eventually halted after losing to the eighth seed and 2012 BWF World Junior champion Kento Momota of Japan in quarterfinals with a rubber games 21–13, 16–21, 15–21.That was the beginning of his meeting with the Indonesia Open champion. At the Hong Kong Open, Ginting met again with Kento Momota in the second round and finally Ginting was able to get his revenge by defeating him 21-7, 21-15. Ginting was part of the Indonesian men's team that won a gold medal at the Southeast Asian Games in Singapore, after beating Thailand men's team 3–2 in the final.

Participating in the Chinese Taipei Open as an unheralded shuttler, Ginting reached the quarterfinals after defeating twelfth-seeded fellow Indonesian Dionysius Hayom Rumbaka with a straight sets 21–16, 21–14 in the third round of the tournament. In the first round, he surprisingly upset the eighth seed and 2009 BWF World Junior Champion Tian Houwei of China with a stunning 21–13, 21–14 victory. He then lost to the defending champion, former world No. 1 and two-time Olympic gold medalist Lin Dan of China with a straight games 7–21, 20–22 in the quarterfinals.

In 2016, Ginting with the Indonesian men's team participating in the Thomas Cup, the team managed to reach the final after beating South Korea 3–1 in the semi final and bringing the Indonesian men's team to the final. In the final, the team was challenged by Denmark. The Indonesian men's team was defeated by Denmark 3–2 on aggregate in the final. Ginting with the Indonesian men's team also succeeded in bringing the men's team trophy to the Asia Team Championships in Hyderabad, India. They beat Japan 3–2 on aggregate. At the Australian open event, Ginting managed to reach the semi-finals after defeating the 2016 Olympic champion Chen Long in the quarter final.

2017: First title in Korea opens and debut at the Sudirman Cup 
In 2017, Ginting won his first title in the Korea Open after beating compatriot Jonatan Christie through a rubber game 21–13, 19–21, 22–20. At the Sudirman Cup, Ginting helps the Indonesian team to score a point when defeating 2017 world champion Viktor Axelsen with a score of 13–21, 21–17, 21–14. Indonesia managed to beat Denmark 3–2 on aggregate, but placed in the bottom position of the standings, after lost to India 1–4 a day before.

2018: The first title in the country and the nickname of the giant killer 
Entering 2018, Ginting started his BWF world tour brilliantly, he managed to become the champion in his homeland of the Indonesia Masters, he managed to beat Kazumasa Sakai in the Final with a score of 21–13, 21–12. Ginting and the Indonesian men's team also managed to win again in these Asia Team Championships after beating China 3–1 in the final.

Ginting competed at the 2018 Asian Games in Jakarta, Indonesia. In the men's team event, he helped Indonesia team made it to the final against China. in the final, Ginting had to face Shi Yuqi, the first game was won by Ginting but Shi Yuqi was able to overtake and win the second game. In the decider, Ginting experienced cramps in his leg so he retired and had to lose the match with a score of 14–21, 23–21, 21–20. In the end, Indonesia had to recognize China's superiority by winning 3–1. Ginting then started his match again in individual event, he had to face 2018 World champion Kento Momota in the second round and 2016 Olympic champion Chen Long in the quarter-finals. Ginting managed to beat the two of them in straight games. In the semifinals he had to face Chou Tien-chen, the match was very exciting but Ginting had to admit Chou's superiority with a thin score of 21–16, 21–23, 17–21. Ginting had to be satisfied with the bronze medal.

Ginting then took a world tour by participating in the China Open tournament, in which Ginting had to fight difficult opponents, the World and Olympics champion Lin Dan, 2017 World champion Viktor Axelsen, World and Olympics champion Chen Long, and in the semifinals again had to faced off Asian Games finalist Chou Tien-chen. He managed to reach the final and had to face off the 2018 World champion Kento Momota. Ginting managed to prove he was worthy of being reckoned with by defeating many of the world's badminton champions, because of that he was named the giant killer in the tournament.

2019–2020: Finalists in five tournaments and second title in Indonesia Masters 

Ginting opened the 2019 season as a quarterfinalists in the Malaysia and Indonesia Masters in January. At the Europe tour in March, Ginting was stopped in the first round to Ng Ka Long in the All England Open, and then defeated by Shi Yuqi at the semi-finals of the Swiss Open. In April, Ginting reached the final of the Singapore Open, lost the match to Kento Momota. As a top seed in the New Zealand Open in May, Ginting was stopped in the quarterfinals with defeat to Lin Dan in rubber games. He then advanced to the final of the Australian Open, but was beaten by his compatriot Jonatan Christie, the head-to-head record between the players stood at 2–3.

In September, Ginting finished runner-up to Momota at the China Open. He has lost his last five matches against Momota since the China Open victory last year. Ginting is again reaching his fourth finals of the year in the Hong Kong Open in November. Unfortunately, he unable to win the title after fought in a close three matches against Lee Cheuk Yiu. Ginting competed in the men's team event at the Philippines Southeast Asian Games, and he managed to contribute one point, bringing Indonesia team won the gold medal against Malaysia 3–1. He has qualified to the year-end tournament Guangzhou World Tour Finals, and again lost the final match against Momota, worsening his head-to-head record against Momota to 4–11. His achievements in 2019, brought him to seventh place in the BWF World ranking.

Ginting kicked-off the 2020 season in Malaysia Masters as eight seed. Unfortunately, he was defeated by unseeded player Huang Yuxiang in the first round in straight games. A week later, in home soil Indonesia Masters tournament, he finally clinched his first title since the 2018 China Open. Ginting defeated the defending champion Anders Antonsen of Denmark in the final. In February, he helped the Indonesian men's team defend the Asia Team Championships title. Ginting reached a career high as world number 3 in the world ranking on 18 February 2020. In March, the fourth seed Ginting, fell in the early round of Super 1000 tournament All England Open to Rasmus Gemke of Denmark. This is for the fifth time, he has defeated in the early round of the historical tournament All England Open, since his debut in 2016.

2021: Olympic bronze medal and Thomas Cup champion 
In 2021, Ginting competed at the 2020 Asian Leg tournament held in Thailand as a fifth seed. At the Yonex Thailand Open, he lost to Viktor Axelsen of Denmark in the semi-finals, while at the Toyota Thailand Open he lost to Lee Cheuk Yiu of Hong Kong in the second round. Ranked as number 9 in the season-end ranking, Ginting then secured a spot to compete at the World Tour Finals. Ginting won his first Olympic medal when he beat Kevin Cordón in the bronze medal match at the 2020 Summer Olympics, becoming the first Indonesian Olympic medalist in the men's singles badminton event since Sony Dwi Kuncoro in the 2004 Summer Olympics. He has become the first badminton player to win medals at both the Youth Olympic Games and Olympic Games, following his bronze medal at the Youth Olympic Games in Nanjing in 2014.

In September–October 2021, Ginting played alongside Indonesia team competed at the 2021 Sudirman Cup in Vantaa, Finland. He played three matches at that tournament, won a match against Ivan Sozonov of Russia, and lost 2 matches to Anders Antonsen of Denmark and Lee Zii Jia of Malaysia. The team finished as the quarter-finalists. In the next tournament, he helped the Indonesian team to win the World Men's Team Championships, the 2020 Thomas Cup. In October, he had to retired in the first round of the Denmark Open due to back pain he suffered during the Thomas Cup. He then suffered an early exit in his home tournament, the Indonesia Masters and Open.

2022 
Started the 2022 season by competing in Europe tour, Ginting still shows inconsistency. He had to accept defeat with a landslide score of 7–21, 9–21 to Lakshya Sen in the second round of the German Open and lost to Viktor Axelsen with a score of 4–21, 9–21 in the quarter-finals of the All England Open. He managed to return to form by reaching the semi-finals in the Swiss Open, but stopped by Prannoy H. S. in a close rubber games. Entered the Korea Open as a top seed, he was beaten in the first round by world number 67, Lucas Claerbout. Ginting ended his two-year title drought by winning the Singapore Open. He upset host player, the 2021 World Champions, Loh Kean Yew in the semi-finals, and Japan's youngster, Kodai Naraoka in the final. Ginting competed at the BWF World Championships in August, but lost to eventual champion Axelsen in the quarter-finals. This loss worsened their head-to-head record, which was Ginting never won a single match against Axelsen in 2022, and the head-to-head record between the players stood at 4–10. Ginting won his second title of the year in the Hylo Open in Saarbrücken, Germany, by defeating Chou Tien-chen in the final. Ginting ended the 2022 tour by competing at the World Tour Finals, and finished runner-up to Axelsen in straight game.

2023 
Ginting opened the 2023 season at the Malaysia Open, but defeated in the quarter-finals round to Japanese player Kanta Tsuneyama. In the following week, he reached the semi-finals of India Open, but defeated by 8th seed Thai player Kunlavut Vitidsarn. He competed in the home tournament, Indonesia Masters, but lost in the second round from Chinese player Shi Yuqi.

In February, Ginting join the Indonesia national badminton team to compete at the Badminton Asia Mixed Team Championships, but unfortunately the teams lost in the quarter-finals from team Korea.

Awards and nominations

Achievements

Olympic Games
Men's singles

Asian Games 
Men's singles

Youth Olympic Games 
Boys' singles

BWF World Junior Championships 
Boys' singles

BWF World Tour (5 titles, 6 runners-up) 
The BWF World Tour, which was announced on 19 March 2017 and implemented in 2018, is a series of elite badminton tournaments sanctioned by the Badminton World Federation (BWF). The BWF World Tour is divided into levels of World Tour Finals, Super 1000, Super 750, Super 500, Super 300, and the BWF Tour Super 100.

Men's singles

BWF Superseries (1 title) 
The BWF Superseries, which was launched on 14 December 2006 and implemented in 2007, was a series of elite badminton tournaments, sanctioned by the Badminton World Federation (BWF). BWF Superseries levels were Superseries and Superseries Premier. A season of Superseries consisted of twelve tournaments around the world that had been introduced since 2011. Successful players were invited to the Superseries Finals, which were held at the end of each year.

Men's singles

 Superseries tournament
 Superseries Premier tournament
 Superseries Finals tournament

BWF Junior International (1 title) 
Boys' singles

  BWF Junior International Grand Prix tournament
  BWF Junior International Challenge tournament
  BWF Junior International Series tournament
  BWF Junior Future Series tournament

Performance timeline

National team 
 Junior level

 Senior level

Individual competitions 
 Junior level

 Senior level

Record against selected opponents 
Record against Year-end Finals finalists, World Championships semi-finalists, and Olympic quarter-finalists. Accurate as of 26 January 2023.

References

External links 

 
 

1996 births
Living people
Karo people
People of Batak descent
People from Cimahi
Sportspeople from West Java
Indonesian male badminton players
Badminton players at the 2014 Summer Youth Olympics
Badminton players at the 2020 Summer Olympics
Olympic badminton players of Indonesia
Olympic bronze medalists for Indonesia
Olympic medalists in badminton
Medalists at the 2020 Summer Olympics
Badminton players at the 2018 Asian Games
Asian Games silver medalists for Indonesia
Asian Games bronze medalists for Indonesia
Asian Games medalists in badminton
Medalists at the 2018 Asian Games
Competitors at the 2015 Southeast Asian Games
Competitors at the 2019 Southeast Asian Games
Southeast Asian Games gold medalists for Indonesia
Southeast Asian Games medalists in badminton
21st-century Indonesian people